The Chrüzli Pass (Swiss German for Small Cross (as a diminutive) Pass) is a historic high mountain pass of the Glarus Alps, located on the border between the Swiss cantons of Uri and Graubünden (GR). It is also known as the Kreuzli Pass or Chrüxli Pass. It connects the Maderanertal (UR) and the Tujetsch (e.g. Sedrun) in Surselva (GR). It is one of the lowest passes between the two cantons and is traversed by a trail.

The pass is overlooked by the Witenalpstock and the Chrüzlistock.

Below the Chrüzlipass, or more precisely between it and the Chrüzlistock, runs the Gotthard Base Tunnel.

References

External links
Chrüzlipass on Hikr

Mountain passes of Switzerland
Mountain passes of the Alps
Mountain passes of Graubünden
Mountain passes of the canton of Uri
Graubünden–Uri border
Tujetsch